The Flemish Government is the executive branch of the Flemish Community and the Flemish Region of Belgium. It consists of a government cabinet, headed by the Minister-President and accountable to the Flemish Parliament, and the public administration (civil service) divided into 13 policy areas, each with an executive department and multiple agencies.

The Flemish Government cabinet consists of up to a maximum of eleven ministers, chosen by the Flemish Parliament. At least one minister must come from Brussels. The ministers are drawn from the political parties which, in practice, form the governing coalition. The Government is chaired by the Flemish Minister-President. Ministers head executive departments of the government administration. Ministers must defend their policies and performance in person before the Flemish Parliament. The Flemish Government must receive and keep the confidence of the Flemish Parliament.
Until 1993 the Flemish Government was called the Flemish Executive (Vlaamse Executieve).

Cabinet composition

Jambon (2019-current)

Homans (2019)

Bourgeois (2014-2019)

Peeters II (2009-2014)
Following the 7 June 2009 election, CD&V (31 seats), N-VA (16 seats) and SP.A (19 seats) parties formed a coalition.

Leterme I/Peeters I (2004-2009)

 From 19 July 2004 to 26 June 2007, the Minister-President of Flanders was Yves Leterme (CD&V), leading a coalition of CD&V-N-VA, VLD-Vivant, and  SP.A-Vl.Pro.
 On 26 June 2007, in the aftermath of the 2007 Belgian general elections, Yves Leterme and Inge Vervotte resigned as minister-president and minister in the Flemish Government to take their seats in the Belgian Parliament. On June 28, Kris Peeters was sworn in as new minister-president, taking over the responsibilities of Leterme, and Vanackere and Crevits replaced Vervotte and Peeters as Flemish ministers.
 On 10 October 2007 Fientje Moerman resigned due to the fallout of a hiring scandal; she was replaced as vice-minister-president by Dirk Van Mechelen and as minister by Patricia Ceysens.
 On 22 September 2008 Geert Bourgeois (N-VA) was forced to resign due to pressure by the SP.A-Vl.Pro and Open VLD coalition partners because of his party's no confidence vote in the federal government of Leterme and their lack of trust in further negotiations by the Regions regarding the state reform. His portfolios of Administrative Affairs, Foreign Policy, Media and Tourism were taken over by minister-president Peeters.
 On December 30, 2008 Steven Vanackere resigned to become federal Minister of Civil Service and Public Enterprises. He was replaced in the Flemish Government by Veerle Heeren.

The composition at the end of the legislature:

Dewael I (1999-2003)/Somers I (2003-2004)

After the regional elections of 1999, a coalition of VLD, SP, Agalev and the VU was formed with Patrick Dewael (VLD) as Minister-President.

After the federal elections of June 2003, Patrick Dewael resigned as Minister-President and went to the federal political level. He was succeeded by Bart Somers as Flemish Minister-President until the end of term in 2004. Due to changes in political parties, the coalition was different:
 Volksunie (VU) fell apart. Instead, Spirit entered the coalition
 the SP was renamed to SP.a
 Agalev was renamed to Groen!

Van den Brande IV (1995-1999)

After the regional elections of 1995 (which were the first direct elections for the Flemish Parliament), a coalition of CVP and SP was formed.

List of Flemish Minister-Presidents

Administration

The Flemish administration (Dutch: Vlaamse overheid) denotes the Flemish civil service. With the 2006 reform program Better Administrative Policy (Dutch: Beter Bestuurlijk Beleid), the Flemish civil service is designed to make the Flemish public administration more efficient and transparent.

The tasks of the Flemish public administration are now organised in 13 policy areas. Each policy area comprises a department and a number of (semi-) independent government agencies. Only those with their own article are mentioned below.

The 11 policy areas are:

 Public Governance and the Chancellery (KB)
 Foreign Affairs (iV)
 Liaison Agency Flanders-Europe (vleva)
 Flanders Investment and Trade (FIT)
 Finance and Budget (FB)
 Education and Training (OV)
 Economy, Science and Innovation (EWI)
 Agency for Innovation by Science and Technology (IWT)
 Participatiemaatschappij Vlaanderen (PMV)
 National Botanic Garden of Belgium
 Culture, Youth, Sport and Media (CJSM)
 Agency for the Promotion of Physical Development, Sport and the Outdoor Recreation (Bloso)
 Royal Museum of Fine Arts Antwerp (KMSKA)
 Welfare, Public Health and Family (WVG)
 Care Inspectorate
 Agriculture and Fisheries (LV)
 Work and Social Economy (WSE)
 Mobility and Public Works (MOW)
 Flemish Transport Company "De Lijn"
 Environment (OMG)
 Flemish Energy Agency (VEA)
 Immovable Heritage

Several other institutes, such as the Flemish Opera and the Flemish Institute for Technological Research (VITO), were not incorporated into the above structure.

Every year, the Minister-President presents the current state of affairs in Flanders and the Government's plans for next year during the September Declaration on the fourth Monday in September.

Budget 

The below figures use the 2018 budget as example, which had €44.7 billion in expenses and €42.3 billion in revenue.

The revenue comes from the following sources:
 56% – Special financing law: the so-called "shared taxes" and "merged taxes" which the federal government raises through income taxes and VAT and partially transfers to the communities and regions based on a complex formula
 34% – Fiscal autonomy
 18% – Opcentiemen: additional "centimes" to the federal income tax (the height of which can be set by the Flemish Government)
 16% – Regional taxes (taxes under the proper authority of the Flemish Government), such as the traffic tax and inheritance tax
 10% – Other revenues

The expenses are as follows per policy area:

Projects 
The Flemish Government owns the rights to Flanders Today, an English-speaking online and print newspaper focused on current affairs in Flanders and Brussels. The project was launched in 2007 by Geert Bourgeois – then Minister of Foreign Affairs and Tourism -, for three main reasons:
 Facilitating the integration of expats living in the region by informing them of the region's current events.
 Informing international journalists about the region, as most foreign correspondents based in Brussels get their news from the French-speaking press because the majority cannot read Dutch. Flanders Today would act as a counterweight to that side of every story.
 Informing diplomats, investors, potential tourists and others outside of Belgium's borders about the region.
In May 2017, the Flemish Government announced it would not be rebidding the Flanders Today project. Both the print and the online version of the paper are to be shut down in October 2017.

See also
 Flanders
 Flanders in Action
 Flemish Community Commission
 Government of the Brussels-Capital Region
 Government of the French Community
 Politics of Flanders

References

External links
 Flemish government (Dutch: Vlaamse overheid), in English
 Flemish government (Dutch: Vlaamse overheid), in Dutch
 Flemish Parliament (Dutch: Vlaams Parlement)
 Flemish Government (Dutch: Vlaamse Regering)

1981 establishments in Belgium
Politics of Flanders
Government of Belgium